"Shake Your Groove Thing" is a song by disco duo Peaches & Herb.  The single reached No. 5 on the U.S. Billboard Hot 100 and No. 4 on the Billboard R&B Chart.  It also reached No. 2 for four weeks on the Billboard Disco chart in 1978.  The song spent 22 weeks on the American charts and became a Gold record.

The song was their first return to the charts in seven years. It was their first hit with the third "Peaches", Linda Greene.

Chart performance

Weekly charts

Year-end charts

Cover versions
 In 1996, Filipino singer Regine Velasquez covered the song for her album Retro.
Shrek Forever After performed on flute by Jeremy Steig as The Pied Piper.
Alvin and the Chipmunks: The Squeakquel sung by The Chipmunks and The Chipettes
 The song is featured in the dance-based music video game Just Dance Kids 2, and covered by The Just Dance Kids.

Popular culture
 In 1997, Intel used this song in an advert for the Pentium II that arrives in New York.
It was heard in TV and movies like: 
The Adventures of Priscilla, Queen of the Desert
An Extremely Goofy Movie 
The Country Bears 
Monster
Shrek Forever After
Scandal.
Mr Motivator's BLT

References

Other sources
The Best of Peaches & Herb (liner notes).

External links
 

1978 singles
1978 songs
Alvin and the Chipmunks songs
Peaches & Herb songs
Polydor Records singles
Songs about dancing
Songs written by Dino Fekaris
Songs written by Freddie Perren